Liparis nugentiae, commonly known as the large sphinx orchid, is a plant in the orchid family and is endemic to Queensland. It is an epiphytic or lithophytic orchid which forms clumps with flattened pseudobulbs, two to four thin leaves and up to twenty greenish or pale yellow flowers. It grows in rainforest at altitudes above  in tropical far North Queensland.

Description
Liparis nugentiae is an epiphytic or lithophytic, clump-forming herb with crowded, dark green to yellowish, flattened overlapping pseudobulbs. The sepals and petals curve downwards. Flowering occurs between September and January.

Taxonomy and naming
Liparis nugentiae was first formally described in 1896 by Frederick Manson Bailey and the description was published in the Department of Agriculture Queensland, Botany Bulletin. The collection was based on a specimen collected by L.J. Nugent on a mountain range near Cairns.

Distribution and habitat
The large sphinx orchid grows on trees and rocks in rainforest that is often in mist. It is widespread and common between Rossville and Eungella National Park.

References 

nugentiae
Orchids of Queensland
Plants described in 1896